The men's 20000 metres elimination competition at the 2018 Asian Games took place on 31 August 2018 at the JSC Rollerskate Circuit.

Schedule
All times are Western Indonesia Time (UTC+07:00)

Results
Legend
DNF — Did not finish
EL — Eliminated

References

External links
Official website

Men's 20000 metres elimination